Parmenas Briscoe was a state legislator in Mississippi. He represented Claiborne County in the Mississippi House of Representatives and Mississippi Senate.

He served as a captain in the Creek War and a general in the Mississippi State Militia.

References

Year of birth missing (living people)
Living people